Nyzhnii Turiv is a village (selo) in Sambir Raion, Lviv Oblast, in south-west Ukraine. It belongs to Borynia settlement hromada, one of the hromadas of Ukraine.

The village was established in 1556. An Orthodox church was probably built soon afterwards. The currently standing wooden Orthodox church was built in 1914, in the Ukrainian national style.

Until 18 July 2020, Nyzhnii Turiv belonged to Turka Raion. The raion was abolished in July 2020 as part of the administrative reform of Ukraine, which reduced the number of raions of Lviv Oblast to seven. The area of Turka Raion was merged into Sambir Raion.

References 

Nyzhnii Turiv
16th-century establishments in Ukraine